Rebecca Raybould (born 14 April 1998) is a British former road and track cyclist. As part of Team Breeze, Raybould won the British National Team Pursuit Championships at the 2018 British National Track Championships and the 2019 British National Track Championships. She also represented England at the 2018 Commonwealth Games in the time trial and pursuit events and was World Junior champion in the scratch race in 2016.

Major results

2015
 National Junior Track Championships
1st  Points race
3rd Scratch
 4th London Nocturne
2016
 1st  Scratch, UCI Junior Track Cycling World Championships
 2nd Individual pursuit, National Junior Track Championships
 UEC European Junior Track Championships
3rd  Points race
3rd  Team pursuit
 3rd National Madison Championships (with Megan Barker)
2017
 3rd Madison, National Track Championships (with Abbie Dentus)
2018
 1st  Team pursuit, National Track Championships
 UEC European Under-23 Track Championships
2nd  Scratch
2nd  Team pursuit
2019
 1st  Team pursuit, National Track Championships

References

External links

1998 births
Living people
British female cyclists
British track cyclists
Cyclists at the 2018 Commonwealth Games
Commonwealth Games competitors for England
Sportspeople from Nuneaton
21st-century British women